Beška may refer to:
 Beška — a village in Serbia
 Beška (Island) —  an island in Skadar Lake in the Montenegrin municipality of Podgorica
 Beška Bridge —  a concrete highroad bridge on the Danube river near Beška, Serbia